The men's hammer throw event at the 1992 World Junior Championships in Athletics was held in Seoul, Korea, at Olympic Stadium on 18 September.  A 7257g (senior implement) hammer was used.

Medalists

Results

Final
18 September

Participation
According to an unofficial count, 21 athletes from 15 countries participated in the event.

References

Hammer throw
Hammer throw at the World Athletics U20 Championships